Sir Cecil Pembrey Grey Wakeley, 1st Baronet KBE CB PRCS FRSE (5 May 1892 – 5 June 1979) was a 20th-century British surgeon.

Life
He was born the eldest son of 12 children at Meresborough House, a country estate near Rainham, Kent, the son of Percy Wakeley (1860–1954) and his first wife Mary ("May") Sophia Pembrey (1865–1940). He was educated at King's School, Rochester and Borden Grammar School, both in Kent and then from 1907 to 1910 at Dulwich College.

In 1910 he went to King's College Hospital, where he received the Jelf Medal for surgery and qualified in 1915. He joined the Royal Navy and spent World War I as a surgeon-lieutenant aboard the hospital ship HMS Garth Castle at Scapa Flow. In 1922 he was appointed to the staff at King’s College, London and was senior surgeon from the age of 41 until his retirement.

In 1926 he was elected a Fellow of the Royal Society of Edinburgh. His proposers were David Waterston, Reginald Gladstone, John Millar Thomson and Joseph Strickland Goodall.

In the Second World War he was again a surgeon serving the Royal Navy at the honorary rank of rear admiral. He was made a baronet in 1952.

In 1947 he founded the Annals of the Royal College of Surgeons of England which he continued to edit until 1969. He was president of the college from 1949 to 1954 during the period of establishment of the Faculty of Anaesthesia. He was elected President of the Hunterian Society for 1961.

Wakeley was active in creationist circles and was a member of the Evolution Protest Movement (now Creation Science Movement).

He died in London on 5 June 1979.

Family

He married Elizabeth Muriel Nicholson-Smith (1896–1985) on 21 July 1925 in Kent.  They had three sons:
 Sir John Cecil Nicholson Wakeley, 2nd Baronet, father of Charles Wakeley (President of the British Society of Skeletal Radiologists)
 Richard Michael Wakeley
 William Jeremy Wakeley

Selected publications

Surgical Pathology (1929) [with St. John Dudley Buxton]
The Pineal Organ (1940) [with Reginald John Gladstone]
Modern Treatment Therapeutics (1950)
Sir George Buckston Browne (1957) [with Jessie Dobson]
Editor of the "Rose and Carless" Manual of Surgery
Editor of the "British Journal of Surgery"

References

Further reading
A. H. Galley. (1972). Sir Cecil Wakeley—Surgeon. Annals of the Royal College of Surgeons of England 50: 28–30.

1892 births
1979 deaths
People educated at King's School, Rochester
People educated at Dulwich College
Alumni of King's College London
Baronets in the Baronetage of the United Kingdom
Companions of the Order of the Bath
Fellows of the Royal Society of Edinburgh
Knights Commander of the Order of the British Empire
Royal Navy Medical Service officers
Royal Navy officers of World War I
People from Rainham, Kent
Fellows of the Royal College of Surgeons